Evgeniya Olegovna Kanaeva OMF (born 2 April 1990) is a Russian individual rhythmic gymnast. She is the only individual rhythmic gymnast in history to win two Olympic all-around gold medals, winning at the 2008 Summer Olympics, where she finished with 3.75 points ahead of silver medalist Inna Zhukova, and at the 2012 Summer Olympics, where she also became the oldest gymnast to win the Olympic gold. On 4 July 2013, Kanaeva received the International Fair Play Award for "Sport and Life".

Kanaeva holds the record for most World titles with seventeen and thirteen European titles. Kanaeva shares the record for most individual world all-around titles with Maria Petrova (1995 tied with Ekaterina Serebrianskaya), Maria Gigova (1971 tied with Galima Shugurova) and fellow Russian gymnasts Yana Kudryavtseva and Dina Averina, and Kanaeva is the one of only three gymnasts to have won all three titles without being tied, impossible due to the tie breaking system even though she never was tied for a title.

At the 2009 World Championship in Mie, Japan, Kanaeva became the first rhythmic gymnast to win all six titles. She repeated the feat at the 2011 World Championship in Montpellier, France, equaling her own record.

In 2009, Kanaeva was awarded the title Merited Master of Sports in Russia. After the 2012 Summer Olympics, on 15 August at the Grand Kremlin Palace, Kanaeva, along with fellow Olympic gold medalists, was awarded the Merit for the Fatherland IV Degree. Russian President Vladimir Putin presented the honors.

Kanaeva is the only gymnast to receive a perfect score under the 30-point judging system, having done so twice: in the 2011 Grand Prix Final in Brno and in the 2012 Grand Prix in Vorarlberg.

Career

Childhood
Kanaeva was born in Omsk, Soviet Union. Her grandmother, a devoted fan of rhythmic gymnastics and figure skating, introduced 6-year-old Kanaeva to rhythmic gymnastics. Her first trainer, Yelena Arais (daughter of Kanaeva's later trainer, Vera Shtelbaums), was impressed by her enthusiasm for learning difficult elements. Shtelbaums, who worked in the same gymnastics school, recalled Kanaeva spending long hours practicing even though all other students were gone, while her grandmother stood in the corridor waiting to take her home. Besides her passion for rhythmic gymnastics, the young Kanaeva was nicknamed 'Mother Teresa' by the training staff and the parents of her childhood friends for her kindness and concern for others.

Kanaeva was selected to join a group of young rhythmic gymnasts from Omsk for try-outs in Moscow at the age of 12. Her performance caught the eye of Amina Zaripova, who was in charge of the youth program. Kanaeva was then invited to train at the School of the Olympic Reserve. Kanaeva improved quickly under the supervision of Shtelbaums who was in Moscow as fellow Omsk native Irina Tchachina's coach. In 2003, at 13 years of age, Kanaeva debuted in international competitions and began winning the junior events, Kanaeva represented ‘Gazprom’ as a junior rhythmic gymnast to take part in the World Club Championship (also known as 'Aeon Cup') in Japan alongside Irina Tchachina and Alina Kabayeva. She won the junior title and was presently noticed by the head coach of the Russian national team, Irina Viner. She was accepted into the Novogorsk training centre for national team members.

Rise
Kanaeva's rise through the senior ranks was not without difficulty due to Russia's repository of rhythmic gymnasts. After the Olympic Games 2004, at which Kabaeva and Tchachina won the gold and silver medals respectively, Kabayeva remained competitive while Vera Sessina and Olga Kapranova rose to become Russia's new leading rhythmic gymnasts, leaving little room for Kanaeva in the competitive sphere. Kanaeva made her senior international debut in 2006 at the International Tournament Schmiden where she won gold in all-around and event finals. She competed at the World Cup stage in Mie competing in clubs and ribbon where she finished 5th.

In summer 2007, Kanaeva competed in World Cup in Corbeil-Essonnes winning the all-around gold medal, she also won gold in hoop, rope and ribbon final defeating Anna Bessonova. She then competed at the World Cup series in Ljubljana where she won bronze in all-around, rope and silver in clubs. At the 2007 European Championships in Baku, Azerbaijan; Kabaeva, Sessina, and Kapranova were chosen to represent Russia. However, on the eve of the competition, Kabaeva withdrew because of an injury. Viner selected Kanaeva from the reserve team as the replacement. Despite the short notice, Kanaeva impressed by winning gold medals in both the individual ribbon and team competition. A few months later, she won another gold medal in the team competition at the World Championship in Patras, Greece.

2008 Olympics season

With the opportunity to take part in the 2008 Beijing Olympic Games growing, all of Kanaeva 's routines (hoop, clubs, rope and ribbon) were designed with high difficulties and her music was selected to bring out her uniqueness, one of which was her ribbon routine performed with the special edited piano version of ‘Moscow Nights (Подмосковные вечера)’.

In the beginning of 2008 season, Kanaeva still faced tough competition from veteran teammates Sessina, Kapranova and Ukrainian rhythmic gymnast, the then-World Champion, Anna Bessonova. However, by mid-spring, Kanaeva began to establish herself by winning all the individual all-around titles in the Grand Prix and World Cup series, as well as the Russian National Championship. At the European Championship in Turin, Italy, she established herself as the number one senior rhythmic gymnast of the Russian national team. She defeated Bessonova and Kapranova with high scores in all her routines ( 18.875 in rope, 18.925 in hoop, 18.875 in ribbon and scored a 19.050 in clubs).
At the 2008 European Championships she became the All-around champion. Viner selected Kanaeva and Kapranova as Russia's entries for the Olympic rhythmic gymnastics competition.

Kanaeva was the youngest among all the finalists in the Olympic rhythmic gymnastics competition. However, she remained calm and made only a few mistakes. In her words, the Olympic Games were "different from all other competitions. You just have to concentrate on yourself, the apparatus and the carpet. You should not pay attention on anything else. I persuaded myself that everything would be alright, that I should not worry." With this mentality and her high level of Technical Difficulty, Kanaeva won the Olympic title with a score of 75.50, ahead of second place Inna Zhukova of Belarus by a margin of 3.50 points.

2009 season

Because of the implementation of the new Code of Points, Kanaeva's style changed drastically in 2009, causing her to struggle with injury and exhaustion early in the season. Nevertheless, Kanaeva won gold medals in all four apparatuses at the 2009 European Championships in May. Then, in July, she collected all nine gold medals at the Universiade and the World Games. Her five gold medals in the Universiade enabled Russia to come first in the overall team ranking. Russian President Dmitry Medvedev openly complimented Kanaeva's contribution. She was also hailed as the "Heroine of the Games" by the official website of Universiade Belgrade 2009.

In September, Kanaeva competed at the World Championships in Mie Prefecture, Japan. Kanaeva qualified for the individual all-around final by placing first in every single apparatus, each with a gold medal. Her results in individual apparatuses (along with those of her teammates Olga Kapranova, Daria Kondakova, and Daria Dmitrieva) helped win the team gold for Russia. In the individual all-around final, Kanaeva won her sixth gold medal by a margin of 0.600, beating by one the record set by Russian gymnast Oxana Kostina in 1992 of most gold medals won in a single rhythmic gymnastics World Championship. President Medvedev again acknowledged Kanaeva's new record by sending her a telegram of congratulations.

2010 & 2011 seasons

In 2010 Kanaeva had an undefeated all-around season winning the gold medals in all-around and event finals at the Grand Prix Final, she repeated as the 2010 European all-around champion ahead of teammate Daria Kondakova. At the 2010 World Championships, she won gold in the all-around, ball, hoop and silver in rope behind teammate Daria Kondakova.

Kanaeva started her 2011 season competing at the 2011 Moscow Grand Prix where she won gold in all-around and all event finals, she won silver in all-around at the Pesaro World Cup behind teammate Daria Kondakova nevertheless, she won all her other World Cup and Grand Prix series all-around competitions. She competed at the 2011 European Championships where she won gold in hoop, ball and a silver medal in ribbon behind Belarusian Liubov Charkashyna. In the 2011 World Championships, Kanaeva broke her own record by again winning 6 gold medals in a single World Championship, the all-around, event finals ( hoop, ball, clubs, ribbon ) and team event. At the 2011 Grand Prix Final in Brno, Kanaeva won gold in all-around and all event finals where she scored a perfect 30 in ribbon under the 30-point judging system. She finished her season winning the all-around at the 2011 Aeon Cup in Japan. She ranked 5th in the world ranking 2011 season, dropped form the 1st in 2010 season due to she didn't take part in many competition in the 2011 season. However, she ranked the 1st again in the 2012 season.

2012 Olympics season

Kanaeva started her season with new hoop, clubs and ball routines at the Moscow Grand Prix. She finished 2nd in the all-around at the 2012 Moscow Grand Prix behind teammate Daria Kondakova, but won gold medals in the ribbon, clubs and hoop finals ahead of Daria Dmitrieva and Daria Kondakova. She followed her win at the Grand Prix by winning the all-around at the International Thiais Tournament. She went on to compete on her first World Cup of the season at Pesaro and won the all-around title as well the clubs, ball and hoop finals. She withdrew from Penza World Cup citing illness. She returned to competition at the Sofia World Cup where she beat the defending champion Daria Kondakova and won the event finals in ball and hoop. She did not qualify for the ribbon finals because of the two per country rule, with Kondakova and Dmitrieva ahead of her in the ribbon qualifications. She was also the champion in all-around at the 2012 Corbeil-Essonnes Cup ahead of compatriots Daria Dmitrieva and Alexandra Merkulova.

At the 2012 European Championships, Kanaeva won her third consecutive European All-around title and posted a score of 29.700 in her ball routine. In an interview after the event, she said: "This victory didn't come easy. In the future I have to put effort on executing elements stronger and more precisely. My coaches are satisfied, and it's very important. I don't live by victory but by what I do." Kanaeva then competed at the Grand Prix Vorarlberg in Austria, where she won gold medals in the all-around and all the apparatus finals. At the World Cup series in Minsk, Kanaeva won the gold medal in All-around ahead of teammate Daria Dmitrieva (silver) and Belarusian Liubov Charkashyna (bronze). Kanaeva also won all the gold medals (Ball, Hoop, Clubs and Ribbon) at the event finals.

In the qualifications at the 2012 Olympics, Kanaeva ranked 2nd on the first day, behind teammate Daria Dmitrieva, after an unusual errant of fumbling her hoop routine. On the second day, she moved ahead of Dmitrieva with a total score of 116.000 points.

During the finals, Kanayeva completed all four apparatus without any major mistakes. She was the only gymnast to score more than 29 points in the ball, hoop and clubs, falling short of that mark only with the ribbon that scored 28.900. Kanaeva finished with a total of 116.900 points, ahead of teammate Daria Dmitrieva who scored a total of 114.500 points.

Post-Olympics
Kanaeva did not continue training after the Olympics. In November 2012, Irina Viner commented about the possibility of Kanaeva's return to the national team, saying "We never discuss the timing of return with such great gymnasts...Any time when she recovers and decides to come back, it will be a great joy for us."

At a conference of the Russian Rhythmic Gymnastics Federation (RRGF) on 4 December 2012 in Novogorsk, Kanaeva announced the end of her competitive career, saying "Most probably, I have finished my career. There was a choice between labor in training and switching to another activity."

At the same conference, it was announced that Kanaeva had been elected a vice-president of the RRGF, along with 2004 Olympic silver medalist Irina Tchachina. Kanaeva had expressed a desire to remain in rhythmic gymnastics indefinitely as a coach or in an administrative position. In June 2009, Shtelbaums stated that Kanaeva had the quality to become a good coach because of her attentiveness in instructing young rhythmic gymnasts.

Kanaeva was ranked 1st as the most Successful Female Athlete of Russia in 2012 beating Aliya Mustafina (2nd) and Maria Sharapova (3rd) for the top ranking. The overall rating was formed in the basis of the greatest number of votes of experts. Also, the maximum figures for the number of references in the paper and press the number of requests in the Russian segment of the Internet for a year.

In September 2013, Kanaeva was named "Woman of the year" by GQ Russia magazine. The award ceremony was held in Mayakovsky Theatre in Moscow.

On 15 February 2015, a star-studded gala was held in Russia for the 80th founding anniversary of Rhythmic Gymnastics. The venue was held in the historical Mariinsky Theatre in St. Petersburg. Among those who performed at the gala were Russian former Olympic champions, Olympic medalists and World champions including: Kanaeva, Yulia Barsukova, Irina Tchachina, Daria Dmitrieva, and Yana Batyrshina.

Early and personal life
Evgeniya Kanaeva was born on 2 April 1990 in the Russian city of Omsk, Siberia (which is also the hometown of former World Champion and the first European Champion Galina Shugurova and 2004 Olympic Silver medalist Irina Tchachina). Her mother, Svetlana, was also a rhythmic gymnast and was granted the title of Master of Sports. Her father, Oleg Kanaev, was a coach and a former Greco-Roman wrestler. She has an elder brother named Egor who is also a Greco-Roman wrestler.

Kanaeva is enrolled at the Siberian State University of Physical Training and Sports. Kanaeva has expressed an interest in learning to draw and play piano after her sporting career. She is also keen on studying foreign languages and computer-related subjects. According to her mother, Kanaeva saves her prize money for future education.

Kanaeva has stated that if she were not a gymnast, she would take up dance professionally.

On 8 June 2013, Kanaeva married ice hockey player Igor Musatov who plays for the HC Slovan Bratislava of the Kontinental Hockey League (KHL). In August, Irina Viner announced Kanaeva was pregnant. However, the pair have since divorced in 2018 due to Igor’s alcoholic behavior. 

On 8 October 2013, Kanaeva's father Oleg died of a heart attack on a plane during a flight from Turkey to Moscow while returning from the World Cup Championships of Greco-Roman wrestling.

On 19 March 2014, Kanaeva gave birth to the couple's first child, a baby boy named Vladimir. 

As of February 2020, Kanaeva has been working as a coach for Junior Russian Gymnasts. She now coaches Sofya Agafonova, a junior member of the Russian National Team, and also, together with Vera Shtelbaums to Anastasia Simakova, 2019 junior world champion in rope and team
.

Skills and influence on rhythmic gymnastics
Pivot: Kanaeva is famous for performing the triple ring pirouette and ring pivot spiral (also known as "The Kanaeva Pivot") which she also popularized and frequently used. Rhythmic gymnasts nowadays incorporate ring pivots as an element executed in routines. She has executed the quadruple ring turn in competitions and has completed the quadruple queen pivot, which is two turns in ring position connected to two turns in back split leg position that she performed from 2006 to 2009 season.

Flexibility: Another signature move by Kanaeva is the switch turn, with the ball on her back while rotating 360 degrees on the floor. She has used her legs to carry the apparatus while performing Switch Turn in Hoop and Clubs, which requires a lot of back flexibility.

Leap and balances: In balance, she has executed the penchee 720-degree turn connecting to a ring knot position in a 360-degree turn. In leaps, she has performed a switch leap with changing legs (almost similar to a Butterfly twist leap) in her 2012 Hoop routine, but the first rhythmic gymnast to perform this was another Russian, Irina Tchachina, who was her coach's previous gymnast. She also performed the triple Kostina (a series of three leaps with exchange of leg) in her rope routine in 2010, but she took it off after changing to her 2nd rope routine, which she performed at the 2010 World Championships.

Mastery: Kanaeva has performed skills like the backscale pivot starting on the floor; then catching the apparatus thrown in the air, as well as a chaine turn while in the last rotation, catching the ball on her back.

Kanaeva is one of the few gymnasts who possesses equal mastery, coordination, and control in pivots, flexibility elements, leaps, and balances. A gymnast known for her consistency, elegant routines and high level of technical difficulty and artistry, she had no weak events in any of the apparatus (hoop, ball, rope, clubs and ribbon).

Endorsements

Kanaeva became the ambassador for luxury watches house Longines in 2009–2012. She was one of the chosen recipient of the Visa Sponsorship for the 2012 London Olympics. Kanaeva was also one of the nine elite athletes chosen to be the ambassador for Pantene for the Olympic Games. She has appeared in a commercial video for Pantene Pro-V.

Kanaeva was one of the 50 elite athletes of Russia chosen as an honorary ambassador for the 2013 Summer Universiade in Kazan.

Records

Grand-Slam
 Kanaeva is only one of the three rhythmic gymnasts to win all Grand-Slam titles after Alina Kabaeva and Ekaterina Serebrianskaya (Olympics, World Championships, European Championships, World Cup Final and Grand Prix Final).

24th RG European Championships Torino, Italy 2008
 Kanaeva became the first RG to score above 19 points ( 19.050 in Clubs ) under the 20-point judging system.

29th RG World Championships Mie, Japan 2009
 Kanaeva set a record in the 29th RG World Championships 2009 in Mie by winning 6 gold medals. She is the first gymnast in RG history to achieve such results in one single World Championship.

31st World Championship Montpellier, France 2011
 She is the only gymnast in the entire rhythmic gymnastics history who has won the most World Championships titles; 17 gold medals.
 She equals the record of Maria Petrova, who won 3 world titles for three consecutive years (1993/1994/1995 tied with Ekaterina Serebrianskaya), Maria Gigova (1969/1971 tied with Galina Shugurova/1973) and Yana Kudryavtseva (2013/2014/2015).
 She is the first gymnast to have won 3 consecutive world titles without sharing the triumph with other gymnasts. Petrova shared the 1995 All-around world title with Ekaterina Serebrianskaya and Gigova shared the 1971 All-around world title with Galina Shugurova. In 2015, this record was then equaled by Yana Kudryavtseva of the Russian Federation which she achieved at the 2015 World Championships.
 It is the second time when Kanaeva won 6 gold medals out of 6. She equals her own record.
 She has won gold medals in all of the apparatus ( 5 apparatus: rope, hoop, ball, clubs and ribbon), a record only tied by Bianka Panova and Ekaterina Serebrianskaya.
 She levels with Maria Petrova in hoop: both have won 3 gold medals in the World Championships.
 She levels with Ekaterina Serebrianskaya and Lilia Ignatova in ball: all of them have won 3 gold medals in the World Championships.

Grand Prix Final Brno, Czech 2011
 On 16 October 2011 Evgeniya Kanaeva scored 30, she got perfect 10 in difficulty, artistry and execution at the ribbon final, Grand Prix Final Brno 2011, Czech. She is the first gymnast in the history of rhythmic gymnastic to achieve full mark under 30 points judging system.

Grand Prix Vorarlberg, Austria 2012
 On 30 June 2012, Evgeniya Kanaeva again scored a perfect 30 under the 30-point judging system at the hoop final, making history again as the only gymnast to achieve full mark in a scoring system twice.

Olympic Games
 Kanaeva is the only rhythmic gymnast to win 2 gold medals (also consecutively) in an individual all around (2008 Beijing and 2012 London).
 On her second Olympics, she became the oldest Rhythmic Gymnast to win a gold medal at 22 years, 4 months and 7 days (Record previously held by Yulia Barsukova of the Russian Federation).

Routine music information

Competitive highlights
(Team competitions in seniors are held only at the World Championships, Europeans and other Continental Games.)

Detailed Olympic results

References

External links

 
 Evgenia Kanaeva Profile 
 Zhenya Kanaeva Gymnasium (Evgenia Kanaeva unofficial fans website)
 
 
 

1990 births
Gymnasts at the 2008 Summer Olympics
Gymnasts at the 2012 Summer Olympics
Living people
Medalists at the 2008 Summer Olympics
Medalists at the 2012 Summer Olympics
Olympic gold medalists for Russia
Olympic gymnasts of Russia
Olympic medalists in gymnastics
Russian rhythmic gymnasts
Russian gymnastics coaches
Sportspeople from Omsk
Medalists at the Rhythmic Gymnastics World Championships
Medalists at the Rhythmic Gymnastics European Championships
World Games gold medalists
Universiade medalists in gymnastics
Competitors at the 2009 World Games
Recipients of the Order "For Merit to the Fatherland", 4th class
Universiade gold medalists for Russia
Universiade silver medalists for Russia
Medalists at the 2009 Summer Universiade
Medalists at the 2011 Summer Universiade
21st-century Russian women